Kiransinh Chauhan ( b. 7 October 1974) is a Gujarati poet and scriptwriter from Gujarat, India.

He was awarded the Shayda Award in 2005.

Early life 
Chauhan was born in Surat, Gujarat to Hirabhai and Revabahen. After completing his primary education from Variyav Primary School, he completed his secondary and higher secondary education from Lokmanya Vidyalaya, Rander. He completed B. A. in 1997 from J. Z. Shah Arts and H. P. Desai Commerce College, Amroli and M. A. from M. T. B. Arts College, Surat with Gujarati literature as one of his subjects. He earned B. P. Ed. in 2002 from Sharirik Prashikshan Mahavidyalay, Tumsar, Maharashtra. In 2005, he completed his B. Ed. from College of Education.

Career 
Chauhan started writing poetry in 1988, venturing into metrical form in 1990. In the same year, his poem, "" appeared in  periodical, published from Surat. He worked as a journalist for five years and as a teacher for seven years. He joined Navgujarat Times in 1997 as a journalist. In 1999, he joined  and then Channel Surat in 2001. From 2002 to 2006, he taught Gujarati and Sanskrit languages at Jivanbharati Vidyalaya, Surat. In 2006, he joined P. R. Khatiwala Vidyasankul, Surat and served as a lecturer at the Valmiki Adhyapan Mandir P. T. C. College, Surat for a year. He is working as a scriptwriter and an anchor. He is also running his own book publishing house Sanidhya Prakashan since 2010.

Works 
He has penned lyrics for Gujarati film  (2011) and also wrote dialogues for Gujarati film . He has appeared in several television shows including Doordarshan and on Akashvani.

Compilations 
  (collection of selected Gujarati , first two lines of a )
  (collection of free verse)
  (collection of parables)
  (selected  poems by Mahesh Davadkar)

Recognition 
He was awarded the Shayda Award (2005) by Indian National Theater, Mumbai. He is also a recipient of Shreshth Yuva Sahityakar Puraskar (Best Young Author Prize) in 2007 by Rashtriya Kala Kendra, Surat.

Personal life 
Chauhan married Smita on 18 February 2003 and they have two sons, Pallav and Namra.

See also 

 List of Gujarati-language writers

References

External links
 

1974 births
Living people
Indian male screenwriters
Gujarati-language writers
Indian male poets
People from Surat
Screenwriters from Gujarat
Poets from Gujarat
20th-century Indian poets
20th-century Indian male writers